Michael McKell (born 10 February 1959, in Bethnal Green, London) is an English actor. He is best known for playing Inspector Trevor Hands in Murder Investigation Team (2003-2005), Dr. Nick West in Doctors (2006-2008) and DS Nicholas "Nick" Henshall in Emmerdale (2008-2011).

Television 
McKell is best known for appearing in two British soap operas, Doctors, in which he played Dr. Nick West from 2006 until the character was run over and killed in 2008, and Emmerdale, in which he has played DC Nick Henshall over two separate periods from 2008 to 2011, until the character committed suicide. He has also appeared in a third soap opera, EastEnders as the hitman Carter who supposedly killed Paul Trueman under the orders of Andy Hunter. For his role as Nick in Doctors, McKell received nominations for Sexiest Male at the 2006, 2007 and 2008 British Soap Awards. His exit storyline later saw a nomination at the 2009 ceremony.

He is also known for playing D.S./D.I. Trevor Hands in two seasons of the ITV drama Murder Investigation Team, two seasons of Channel 4's Totally Frank and the BBC One series Blessed, playing Ronnie, a Jaggeresque musician. He came to prominence in the mid-1990s as the character Tony in a series of British television commercials for the Peugeot 106 car, alongside Julie Graham and Annie Dunkley. He was the face of Ancestry in their national campaign 2019.

He appeared in the final episode of BBC2's  Cradle to Grave in October 2015. Most recently appeared in ITV drama Vera 2019.

He appeared in an episode of BBC afternoon drama-comedy Shakespeare & Hathaway: Private Investigators entitled The Rascal Cook, in which he played Len Tekler. The episode first aired on 8 March 2018 and was repeated on 21 March 2019.

Film   
McKell starred in the cult film Essex Boys alongside Sean Bean as drug dealer Wayne Lovell. Other films include Beneath Still Waters,  Act's Of Godfrey, The Low Down, Blood, Bar, Death, Freight, Shouting Men, Outpost: Rise of the Spetsnaz, Hatton Garden: the Heist, and Who Needs Enemies.

He has appeared in over 30 films, including Allied with Brad Pitt and Where Hands Touch, directed by Amma Asante. McKell co-produced and starred in Winter Ridge. The Guard Of Auschwitz, Abatement, 13 Graves, Once Upon A Time In London, Pentagram, The Angel Of Auschwitz and Irish Stand Down, were all released in 2019. 2019's Lucas & Albert features Michael's daughter Claudia Grace McKell, who herself is a director for her first film Just A Girl. 

Recently, Mckell played the titular roles in Steve Lawson's 2021 film Jekyll and Hyde, and appeared in 2022's Prizefighter with Matt Hookings, Ray Winstone and Russell Crowe.

Theatre 
From January to July 2015, McKell co-starred with Tina Hobley, Jamie Lomas, Rik Makarem and Gray O'Brien in a nationwide touring production of  Peter James's  Dead Simple.

In September/October 2015, McKell appeared with Nick Moran in Roaring Trade at The Park Theatre.

From 7 December 2015 to 3 January 2016, McKell  appeared in his first pantomime as Abanazar in Aladdin at the Derby Arena. McKell went back to his roots to play Paul in Irvine Welch's play Creatives at The Edinburgh Festival 2017. McKell is about to embark on a UK and Ireland tour with Queen and Ben Elton’s We Will Rock You 2019/2020.Michael resumes the tour post Covid in 2022

Music

McKell started his working life as a musician. He was the singer/songwriter for the band The Park, penning hits for Toyah, Dollar and Julien Clerc. His solo career after deals with Phonogram, WEA and EMI was cut short by a near fatal car crash in August 1991. McKell returned to the stage in Macbeth at The Lyric Hammersmith in the late 1990s. He has appeared in  West End musicals, including Blood Brothers  Rod Stewart musical Tonight's the Night, written and directed by Ben Elton. Elton later went on to write the character Ronnie for McKell in his BBC comedy Blessed. McKell played "Lank" in the double Olivier winning production of Crazy For You in 2012 and returned to the role he created  "Stoner" in the 2014 production of Tonight's The Night.

In 1985, he toured as Michael St James with French star Julien Clerc and worked with French singer/songwriter Serge Gainsbourg.

McKell  released an EP, Shower Over Moon Street, in 2009 and performed tracks from his album Shower Over Moon Street at The Royal Albert Hall in November 2009. "Save Me", the first single from the album, was released 25 July 2010.In 2022 Michael  is back on the road with We Will Rock You and he will be releasing his new album The Last Picture Show

References

External links
 

English male soap opera actors
English male musical theatre actors
English male film actors
English male television actors
Living people
1959 births